611 or variation may refer to:

In general
 611 (number), a number in the 600s range

Time
 611 AD, a year in the Common Era
 611 BC, a year Before the Common Era

Places
 Route 611, see List of highways numbered 611
 611 Place, a skyscraper in Los Angeles, California, USA
 611 Valeria, an asteroid in our Solar System, the 611th asteroid registered

Transportation
 Flight 611 (disambiguation)
 Project 611, a Soviet submarine class
 London Buses route 611, London, England, UK

Rail
 Caledonian Railway 611 class, a saddle-tank steam locomotive class
 CIE 611 Class, a German locomotive train class
 DB Class 611, a diesel multiple unit train class
 JŽ series 611, a diesel multiple unit train class

Other uses
 6-1-1, an N-1-1 number in North America 
 611 socket, a modular phone jack in Australia

See also

 
 61 (disambiguation)